The French World Scrabble Championships is an annual Scrabble tournament that takes place in a different French-speaking country every year. Created in 1972 by Hippolyte Wouters, it was the first of the three World Scrabble Championships to be created, with the English version being created in 1991 and the Spanish version being created in 1997.

Unlike the English and Spanish versions, the French World Championships are made up of various tournaments, somewhat like the World Series of Poker. The "Main Event" is the Elite tournament which has existed since 1972, and was first won by the tournament's creator Hippolyte Wouters.

List of tournaments

World Championships

Elite: Each national federation has a specified number of places in the Elite division in different age categories: Up to 16, 16-18, 18-25, 25-62, 62-72 and 72+. Each of these age categories has its own World Champion, but the individual World Champion is the player that wins the tournament. The tournament is a duplicate tournament where players do not play matches, but play every move with the same letters and board configuration as every other player and try to get the maximum score by playing the highest scoring move every time. Players play 7 games of 2 minutes per move.
Paires: Duplicate Scrabble in pairs, with two players discussing and submitting their solution together. 4 games are played with two minutes per move, followed by 2 games with just one minute per move. Players can form mixed pair, i.e. not both from the same country.
Blitz: A normal duplicate tournament but with 4 games with just one minute per move for all four games.
Classique (match play): Players play 17 games, two players to a board with the final standings being judged by games won and total points scored minus the total number of points scored by the player's opponents. The top two players in the standings play a best-of-three final to determine the World Champion. The tournament is very popular with Arab players as Duplicate Scrabble is less popular in the Arab World than it is in Europe.

Other tournaments

Some other tournaments are organised during the week which do not crown a World Champion but do have a winner:

 Open classique: a matchplay Scrabble tournament open to players who have not already qualified for the Elite world championship. The winner qualifies for the Elite.
Open duplicate: an open duplicate tournament which anyone can compete in. Players who are qualified for the Elite are barred from competing in the Open under the rules of the International Federation.
Défi mondial: A duplicate game reserved for qualified players. The game is a normal duplicate game, apart from any player who misses the highest scoring solution is eliminated. This process continues until there is only one player remaining. To make things harder, the game starts at 80 seconds per move and goes down to 60 then 40 seconds per move.
Défi des jeunes: the same as the Défi mondial but for players aged under 18. Another notable difference is that each player can miss the highest scoring move once before being eliminated.

History of the Championships

The French World Scrabble Championships started off as a small tournament in Cannes with just 7 players, and at the time, was not considered to be a World Championship. The tournament moved each year and more and more players which led to other tournaments being created at the same venue. The Elite tournament was at first dominated by Belgian players, with 5 of the first 7 championships being won by Belgian players. After three French winners in 1979, 80 and 81 the tournament was taken over by Michel Duguet of France who won the tournament 5 times in 7 years, while finishing second twice in that period. Duguet also set various championship records by dropping just 12 points in 5 games, which is 99.71%. After winning the Elite World Championship for a 5th time he retired from Scrabble and took up contract bridge and became one of the best players in the world, competing in both the French national championships and the European team championships.

After Duguet's retirement the French domination of the championships continued, with in total 12 championships in a row being won by France. Indeed, France also took second place every year during that ran, apart from in 1990 when Christian Pierre of Belgium finished second. In 1991 it was Christian Pierre who won Belgium's first title since 1978 and continued to win the title a total of 5 times in 8 years, matching what Duguet did in the 1980s. In 2002 and 2003 Jean Pierre Hellebaut became the first Swiss winner of the tournament. In fact he was born in Belgium and had previously finished second in the Belgian national championship in 1991 but after moving to Switzerland, won the World Championship 2 years in a row, a feat only accomplished before that by Duguet and Pierre. Antonin Michel has since dominated the Elite World Championships, having won the tournament twice in 2005 and 2007 and having finished second in 2001 and 2006.

The pairs event has been mainly dominated by France; Michel Duguet holds the record with five titles while Antonin Michel and Franck Maniquant (also of France) are just behind with 4 titles. Two African players have won the title - Ndongo Samba Sylla and Mactar Sylla of Senegal - these two are in fact brothers.

The blitz is a relatively recent event, added in 2001 and 5 of the 8 championships have been won by Antonin Michel. The four other winners and Florian Lévy and Franck Maniquant of France, and Ndongo Samba Sylla and Mactar Sylla of Senegal.

The match play tournament known as le Championnat du monde de Scrabble classique was brought in during 2006 and has been systematically dominated by African players, showing that the traditional form of Scrabble is more popular in Africa than the duplicate one. In 2008 in Dakar, 7 of the top 10 players were African, the three exceptions being Pascal Astresses, Antonin Michel and Hervé Bohbot all from France. More recently, the 2015 event saw Africans claim six of the top 10 places, and in 2016 the top three players and seven of the top 10 were Africans.

List of winners of the Elite (duplicate individual) tournament

List of winners of the Classique (matchplay) tournament

References

External links
 Article about the 2008 World Championships on bbc.co.uk
 FISF.net the site of the International French language Federation.
 Montpellier 2010 Official site of the world championships in Montpellier, includes a list of all previous winners 1972-2010.
 FFSC en direct retransmission via the Internet of major French language tournaments.
 French World Scrabble Championships on the French Wikipedia.

French
Recurring events established in 1972
World Scrabble Championships